Dearing, as a name, may refer to:

Bob Dearing (born 1935), Democratic member of the Mississippi Senate
Charles Dearing, former New Zealand fencer
Denise Dearing, American ecological physiologist and mammalogist
Edgar Dearing (1893–1974), American actor
James Dearing (1840–1865), Confederate States Army officer during the American Civil War
Paul Dearing (1942–2015), Australian field hockey player
R. E. Dearing (1893–1968), English film editor
Ronald Dearing, Baron Dearing (1930–2009), English civil servant

Dearing, as a place, may refer to:

 Dearing, Georgia, a town in McDuffie County, Georgia, United States
 Dearing, Kansas, a city in Montgomery County, Kansas, United States

Dearing may also refer to:

Dearing Report, a series of reports on Higher Education in the United Kingdom
Dearing House (Newark, Arkansas), a historic house in Arkansas